The 2014 Syncrude National was held from March 12 to 16 at the MacDonald Island Park in Fort McMurray, Alberta as part of the 2013–14 World Curling Tour. The event was the third men's Grand Slam event of the season. The event was held in a round robin format, and the purse for the event was CAD$100,000.

Teams
The teams are listed as follows:

Round-robin standings
Final round-robin standings

Round-robin results
All draw times are listed in Mountain Time Zone (UTC−7).

Draw 1
Wednesday, March 12, 7:00 pm

Draw 2
Thursday, March 13, 10:00 am

Draw 3
Thursday, March 13, 1:30 pm

Draw 4
Thursday, March 13, 5:00 pm

Draw 5
Thursday, March 13, 8:00 pm

Draw 6
Friday, March 14, 10:00 am

Draw 7
Friday, March 14, 1:30 pm

Draw 8
Friday, March 14, 5:00 pm

Draw 9
Friday, March 14, 8:30 pm

Draw 10
Saturday, March 15, 9:00 am

Tiebreaker
Saturday, March 15, 12:00 pm

Playoffs

Quarterfinals
Saturday, March 15, 3:00 pm

Semifinals
Saturday, March 15, 6:30 pm

Final
Sunday, March 16, 10:00 am

References

External links

National, 2014 March
Fort McMurray
National, 2014 March
2014 in Alberta
The National (curling)